The 35th National Hockey League All-Star Game was held on February 8, 1983, at the Nassau Veterans Memorial Coliseum in Uniondale, New York, home to the New York Islanders.  In the game, Edmonton Oilers' centre Wayne Gretzky set an All-Star Game record by scoring all of his four goals in the third period.  Gretzky's four goal performance was instrumental in winning his first All-Star M.V.P. honor.  Wayne Gretzky's Edmonton Oilers' linemate Mark Messier assisted on three of the four goals in the third period to set an All-Star Game record for most assists in a period.

Uniforms
Following the overload of stars on the 1982 All-Star uniforms, the NHL opted to simplify the designs for 1983. The number of stars on the jersey were reduced to six on the front and back of the waistline, above a contrasting stripe, and three on each sleeve, below the numbers. The sleeves also featured a contrasting stripe panel running from the collar down to the cuff, similar to the stripe used by the Toronto Maple Leafs at the time. The NHL shield continued to be worn on the right shoulder, while the All-Star shield (introduced in 1981) made its uniform debut here on the left shoulder. The NHL also placed the conference names on the uniform for the first time, with the home Wales Conference team wearing white jerseys with orange trim, and the visiting Campbell team wearing orange jerseys with black trim. The player names and numerals were rendered in a block-shadow font similar to the style used by the New York Rangers.

Game summary

Referee: Bob Myers
Linesmen: Ryan Bozak, Leon Stickle
TV: CBC, SRC, USA Network

Notes 
John Garrett was involved in one of the oddest scenarios in the history of the NHL All-Star Game. Replacing an injured Richard Brodeur, the Vancouver Canucks only representative at the 1983 All-Star game that year, John Garrett was voted the game's MVP before the end of the game. After Wayne Gretzky scored four times in the last ten minutes, a re-vote was held and Gretzky was named the All-Star Game MVP. 

Vancouver goaltender Richard Brodeur was named to the Campbell team, but did not play due to an ear injury. John Garrett took his place.

References
 

All
Sports in Long Island
National Hockey League All-Star Games
Ice hockey competitions in New York (state)
National Hockey League All-Star Game
National Hockey League All-Star Game